Kashara is the name of two rural localities in Kursk Oblast, Russia:
Kashara, Konyshyovsky District, Kursk Oblast, a village in Platavsky Selsoviet of Konyshyovsky District, 
Kashara, Ponyrovsky District, Kursk Oblast, a village in Olkhovatsky Selsoviet of Ponyrovsky District,

References